Winter Moon is a 1981 album by jazz saxophonist Art Pepper playing with Stanley Cowell, Howard Roberts, Cecil McBee, Carl Burnett and with strings arranged and conducted by Bill Holman ("Our Song", "When the Sun Comes Out", "Blues in the Night", "Winter Moon") and Jimmy Bond ("Here's That Rainy Day", "That's Love", "The Prisoner").

Track listing
"Our Song" (Art Pepper) – 5:29
"Here's That Rainy Day" (Jimmy Van Heusen; Johnny Burke) – 5:18
"That's Love" (Art Pepper) – 4:50
"Winter Moon" (Hoagy Carmichael) – 5:30
"When the Sun Comes Out" (Harold Arlen; Ted Koehler) – 5:47
"Blues in the Night" (Harold Arlen; Johnny Mercer) – 6:59
"Prisoner (Love Theme from Eyes of Laura Mars)" (Lawrence; John Desautels) – 6:45

Personnel

Musicians
Art Pepper – alto saxophone; clarinet on "Blues in the Night"
Stanley Cowell – piano
Howard Roberts – guitar
Cecil McBee – bass
Carl Burnett – drums
Nate Rubin - violin, concert master
Mary Ann Meredith, Sharon O'Connor, Terry Adams - cello
Audrey Desilva, Clifton Foster, Dan Smiley, Elizabeth Gibson, Emily Van Valkenburg, Greg Mazmanian, John Tenney, Patrice Anderson, Stephen Gehl - violin

Other personnel
Bill Holman - arranger, conductor
Jimmy Bond - arranger, conductor
Phil Carroll - art director
George Horn - mastering
Galen Rowell - photography
Ed Michel - producer
Baker Bigsby, Wally Buck - recording
Danny Kopelson - recording assistant

References

1981 albums
Art Pepper albums
Galaxy Records albums